Natalie Brunell is a Polish-American media personality, investigative journalist, podcast host and educator. She hosts the Coin Stories podcast, featuring the leading voices in Bitcoin and economics. She was recently a senior correspondent and investigative reporter for Spectrum News 1 LA and an adjunct instructor of advanced video storytelling at the USC Annenberg School for Communication and Journalism. She hosts two podcasts highlighting origin and success stories: Coin Stories and Career Stories.

Early life
Natalie was born in Lodz, Poland and immigrated to the United States with her family when she was five years old. Her family took up residence in the suburbs of Chicago, Illinois. As a child, Natalie trained as a classical dancer and attended acting courses at TVI Studios in Chicago. She went to college at Pepperdine University where she double-majored in Broadcast Journalism and Italian Studies. Natalie helped launch the Italian Studies major at Pepperdine and was one of the first students to graduate with the degree. She spent four semesters living in Florence, Italy and worked at SeeTen, a bilingual production company that created travel, arts and cultural segments for Italian TV. Following college she worked at Creative Artists Agency then attended the Medill School of Journalism at Northwestern University.

Career
Natalie began her career in the entertainment industry, serving as a receptionist and subsequently a floating assistant at CAA. After receiving her Master's of Science in Journalism, she was awarded the 2012 "Master's News Fellowship" for CNN based in the Los Angeles bureau. After her fellowship, she continued to serve CNN as a freelance associate producer and took on another freelance multimedia production job for Reuters TV.

Natalie's first on-camera position was at KESQ-TV in Palm Springs, CA, where she worked her way up from MMJ to investigative reporter and fill-in anchor. Her work at KESQ garnered her an Emmy nomination for "Best Investigative Series" for her reporting on alleged corruption within Palm Springs City Hall, as well as an Emmy win for "Best Spot News Coverage" for KESQ's 'Live at 5' breaking news team coverage of a fire in the Coachella Valley.

Natalie then jumped more than 120 TV markets to join the top rated NBC station KCRA-TV in Sacramento, CA. At KCRA, Natalie covered breaking news, enterprise reporting and features.

In 2018 Natalie began contributing to ABC News as a national correspondent for ABC NewsOne based in Los Angeles. She traveled across the U.S. covering breaking news and national stories, including California's devastating wildfires, Hurricane Florence, the Thousand Oaks mass shooting, the 2018 Midterm Election, and First Lady Barbara Bush's funeral.

Natalie launched the Career Stories podcast in February 2018, featuring one-on-one interviews with successful media personalities about their career paths and advice for success. Her interviews include social media fitness influencer Kayla Itsines, former White House communications director Anthony Scaramucci, and dozens of TV News personalities. Within just a few months, Career Stories was named one of the Top 50 Podcasts in Apple's career category according to Chartable.

In 2019 Natalie joined Spectrum News as a senior correspondent and investigative journalist. Her work at Spectrum News has been nominated for an LA Press Club Award and for an Emmy in Investigative Reporting.

In 2021, Natalie launched the Coin Stories podcast, which is focused on cryptocurrency and Bitcoin. Coin Stories features one-on-one interviews with leading voices in the crypto space about their origin stories and philosophies on monetary policy, economics, and digital currencies such as Bitcoin. Coin Stories quickly ranked among the top 100 Business Podcasts according to Chartable.

Awards
In 2014, Natalie was the winner of the "Dancing with the Desert Stars" competition in Palm Springs.

In 2016 Natalie was nominated for a 'Best Investigative Series' Emmy Award for a six-month series titled "Scandal at City Hall". The same year, she was part of an Emmy Award-winning team at KESQ for Breaking News Coverage.

In 2019, Natalie won second place for 'Best One-on-One Interview' in the National Press Club's National Arts and Entertainment Journalism Awards for an interview with Maz Jobrani.

References

External links
 "Career Stories with Natalie Brunell" podcast at 

Living people
20th-century American journalists
American reporters and correspondents
American television journalists
American women television journalists
Journalists from Illinois
1986 births
Pepperdine University alumni
Medill School of Journalism alumni
20th-century American women
21st-century American women